95 South are an American hip hop group from Jacksonville, Florida. They started as a Miami bass group of Artice "AB" Bartley, Carlos "Daddy Black" Spencer and Jay "Ski" McGowan. The group's name is a reference to Interstate 95, which passes through the city. Today, 95 South is a duo composed of Mike Mike (Michael Phillips) and Daddy Black (Carlos Spencer).

Their biggest success was the 1993 hit "Whoot, There It Is", from their debut album Quad City Knock, which reached No. 11 on the Billboard Hot 100. The song was produced by C.C. Lemonhead and Jay "Ski" McGowan, then known as The Bass Mechanics. The album reached at No. 71 on the Billboard 200.

There was a female member, named K-Nock, featured on Quad City Knock. Her vocals can be heard on the songs "K-Knock in da House/We Got da Bass" and "Da Kinda Bass".

In 1995, they released their second album, One Mo' 'Gen. It contained the song "Rodeo" which reached No. 77 on the Billboard Hot 100. The album itself peaked at No. 158 on the Billboard   200. In 1997, 95 South made a guest appearance on Aaron Carter's eponymous debut album for the song "Shake It". In 2000, the group contributed to the soundtrack for the film Bring It On, with the song "Cheer for Me". Their third album, Tightwork 3000, followed in 2000. The duo also remixed songs for artists including Jordan Knight, Dru Hill and LFO.

Since 2000, the group has continued to tour the United States at major festivals including Grad Bash, Funk Fest tours, at colleges and in private functions. In 2014, they started touring with a live band in addition to a DJ. The single "Ridin in My Chevy" was released in April 2016. 95 South released another single, "After Party" on December 16, 2016. In 2016, the group announced they added a four piece band to the group.

Discography

References

External links
 Ridin' in My Chevy — Two B Entertainment
 GBoogie talks to Mike Mike of the classic bass group 95 South about their new single “Ridin In My Chevy” and more!
 95 South Releases “Ridin In My Chevy”

Musical groups established in 1993
Southern hip hop groups
American musical duos
Musical groups from Jacksonville, Florida
Miami bass groups
1993 establishments in Florida
Hip hop duos
RCA Records artists